Agua de Dios (literally in ) is a municipality and town of Colombia in the department of Cundinamarca.

References

Municipalities of Cundinamarca Department
Populated places established in 1870
1870 establishments in Colombia